is a Japanese speed skater. He competed in two events at the 2002 Winter Olympics.

References

1974 births
Living people
Japanese male speed skaters
Olympic speed skaters of Japan
Speed skaters at the 2002 Winter Olympics
Sportspeople from Hokkaido
Speed skaters at the 1996 Asian Winter Games